Cabela's GrandSlam Hunting: 2004 Trophies is the first sequel to Cabela's GrandSlam Hunting: North American 29. It was developed by American studio  and released on August 28, 2003.

The game was published by Activision, in conjunction with hunting supply company Cabela's.

External links

2003 video games
Windows games
Windows-only games
Activision games
Cabela's video games
Video games developed in the United States